Tarring may refer to:

 Tarring, West Sussex, a neighbourhood in England
 Tarring (electoral division), a West Sussex County Council constituency
 Tarring (rope) 
 Tarring and feathering
 John Tarring (1806–1875), English ecclesiastical architect